Gossamer is the second studio album by American electropop band Passion Pit. It was released on July 20, 2012, by Columbia and Frenchkiss Records. Recorded in 2011 in Los Angeles and New York City, the album was produced by Chris Zane, who also produced the band's debut album Manners (2009), and lead singer Michael Angelakos.

In an August 2010 interview with NME, Angelakos stated that work had already begun on the follow-up to Manners, and that the band intended to release the album in the spring of 2011. "It's gonna be a really fantastic, exciting, beautiful, gorgeous record. An absolutely beautiful record. I'm so excited", he said. The album's title and release date were announced on April 24, 2012.

Singles
"Take a Walk" was released as the album's lead single on May 8, 2012. The accompanying music video, directed by David Wilson and supported by The Creators Project, was shot in Philadelphia from the perspective of a bouncing ball using helicam technology.

Second single "I'll Be Alright" was released on June 12, 2012. It received exposure after being featured on the video game FIFA 13, and received "Best New Track" status by Pitchfork.

"Constant Conversations" was released as the album's third single on July 9, 2012, and was featured as "Best New Track" by Pitchfork. An official remix of "Constant Conversations" by American rapper Juicy J premiered on February 28, 2013.

"Carried Away" was released on January 8, 2013, as the fourth and final single from the album. The music video, directed by Brewer, was released on February 14, 2013, and featured American actress Sophia Bush.

A music video for promotional single "Cry Like a Ghost", directed by Daniel Kwan and Daniel Scheinert, was released on March 27, 2013.

Critical reception

Gossamer received generally positive reviews from music critics. At Metacritic, which assigns a normalized rating out of 100 to reviews from mainstream publications, the album received an average score of 76, based on 36 reviews. The Guardians Caroline Sullivan commented that Angelakos' "ability to create sunlight and sparkle with an arsenal of sequencers and computers remains consistent, and is the album's real point of interest." Russell Warfield of Drowned in Sound opined that "while retaining [the] overactive production style, Angelakos manages to make Gossamer feel more effortlessly human, more like the self-realised artistic vision of an individual than Manners ever came close to being." Pitchforks Ian Cohen described Gossamer as "an overwhelming album about being overwhelmed, a bold and ultimately stunning torrent of maximalist musical ideas, repressed anger, and unchecked anxiety." The A.V. Clubs Ryan Reed found Gossamer to be "more elegant than its predecessor" and concluded, "Throughout Gossamer, Angelakos sounds broken and confused, wrestling with his demons, cage match-style, on an oversized stage [...] But despite the emphasis on struggle, Gossamer couldn't sound more assured."

James Christopher Monger of AllMusic stated, "Though the environment that birthed the appropriately titled Gossamer may be a bummer, the end product is winningly majestic as it is obviously spun by the most malevolent of spiders." John Calvert of NME wrote that "one quibble is that Gossamer never really comes down off its Haribo rush, which gets exhausting. That said, when they do ease up, as on the boudoir-funk 'Constant Conversations', it resembles the two-a-penny synthpop that clogs the blogosphere." Rolling Stones Jon Dolan expressed that the album is "roomier and more varied" than its predecessor Manners. Chicago Tribune writer Greg Kot viewed Gossamer as "a soul record disguised as buoyant, uptempo dance-pop." Benjamin Aspray of PopMatters felt that the album is "as scrappy, outsize, and infectious as anyone could hope for, and as shrill and cloying as anyone could expect." Sam Walker-Smart of Clash called the album "a colorful twelve-track ode to joy", but noted that "the album's main fault [is] how every track merges into one big goofy smile-a-thon while never delivering a number as exciting as previous hit 'Sleepyhead'." Slant Magazines Kevin Liedel critiqued that "much of Gossamer plays as though it were constructed (however poorly) from ['Sleepyhead's] template [...] The band, in effect, seems to be desperately chasing a winning blueprint", adding that apart from the song "Constant Conversations", Gossamer is "true to its name: colorless and precariously thin, with precious few bright spots."

Accolades
The album was listed at number 18 on Under the Radars "Top 100 Albums of 2012", and the magazine commented, "Fueled by the confession, guilt, and cathartic honesty of frontman Michael Angelakos, [Gossamer] is one of the most lyrically painful records of 2012. It also happens to be one of the year's most musically euphoric, stacked to the brim with electro-pop." Gigwise named Gossamer the 20th best album of 2012 and opined, "Rarely has an album been better named; Gossamer is delicate, light, and oh so finely spun. It's despondant while having no time for despondancy; sadness lurks underneath but only to remind us that there are so many other things we could be doing, emotions we could be feeling."

Rolling Stone placed the album at number 39 on its "50 Best Albums of 2012" list and stated it is "shinier, busier and even more hysterically earnest than their debut: Angelakos' falsetto ricochets like laser light, chipper gals coo smoke-machine choruses amid hot electronics and cool string arrangements." PopMatters ranked it at number 66 on its list of "The 75 Best Albums of 2012", writing that the album's title "speaks volumes about the contents, a thinly veiled peek into the psyche of singer/songwriter Michael Angelokos."

Commercial performance
Gossamer debuted at number four on the Billboard 200 with first-week sales of 37,000 copies, a career best. The album had sold 216,000 copies in the United States as of April 2015.

In the United Kingdom, the album sold 2,444 copies to enter the UK Albums Chart at number 56, one position lower than its predecessor, Manners.

Track listing

Personnel
Credits adapted from the liner notes of Gossamer.

Musicians

 Michael Angelakos – all vocals, instruments, programming
 Chris Zane – drums, percussion 
 Nico Muhly – celeste, piano, string arrangements 
 Caleb Burhans, Max Mandel, Nadia Sirota – violin 
 Anna Elashvili, Keats Dieffenbach, Rob Moose, Yuki Numata – viola 
 Clarice Jensen – cello ; flute 
 Eric Lamb – flute 
 Ebba Lovisa Andersson, Petra Brohäll, Amanda Wikström – additional vocals 
 Jon Natchez – baritone saxophone, tenor saxophone 
 Kelly Pratt – trumpet, trombone 
 Andrew Esposito – aux percussion, additional programming 
 Diplo – additional programming 
 Mike Dunkley – additional programming

Technical
 Chris Zane – production, mixing
 Michael Angelakos – production
 Alex Aldi – engineering, additional production, mixing
 Greg Calbi – mastering at Sterling Sound, New York City

Artwork
 Anita Marisa Boriboon – art direction, design
 Mark Borthwick – photography

Charts

Weekly charts

Year-end charts

Certifications

Release history

References

2012 albums
Columbia Records albums
Frenchkiss Records albums
Passion Pit albums